The 2021 Chechen Republic head election took place on 17–19 September 2021 alongside national parliamentary elections. Incumbent Head Ramzan Kadyrov was re-elected for his fourth term.

Background
Ramzan Kadyrov was first appointed as President of the Chechen Republic in 2007 and later was re-appointed in 2011. In 2016, Kadyrov ran in his first head election and won it with 97.94% of the vote. Since the retirements of governors Yevgeny Savchenko of Belgorod Oblast in September 2020 and Sergey Morozov of Ulyanovsk Oblast in April 2021, Kadyrov became the longest serving head of Russian region. On 24 June 2021, President Vladimir Putin endorsed Ramzan Kadyrov for re-election and 3 days later Kadyrov announced his candidacy for head election.

Candidates
Only political parties can nominate candidates for head election in Chechnya, self-nomination is not possible. However, candidate is not obliged to be a member of the nominating party. Candidate for Head of the Chechen Republic should be a Russian citizen and at least 30 years old. Candidates for Head should not have a foreign citizenship or residence permit. Each candidate in order to be registered is required to collect at least 7% of signatures of members and heads of municipalities (179-187 signatures). Also head candidates present 3 candidacies to the Federation Council and election winner later appoints one of the presented candidates.

The Liberal Democratic Party declined to nominate a candidate in head election.

Registered candidates
Ramzan Kadyrov (United Russia), incumbent Head of the Chechen Republic
Isa Khadzhimuradov (A Just Russia — For Truth), former Mayor of Grozny (2020-2021)
Khalid Nakaev (Communist Party of the Russian Federation), Member of Parliament of the Chechen Republic

Results

|- style="background-color:#E9E9E9;text-align:center;"
! style="text-align:left;" colspan=2| Candidate
! style="text-align:left;"| Party
! width="75"|Votes
! width="30"|%
|-
| style="background-color:;"|
| style="text-align:left;"| Ramzan Kadyrov (incumbent)
| style="text-align:left;"| United Russia
| 711,973
| 99.70
|-
| style="background-color:;"|
| style="text-align:left;"| Isa Khadzhimuradov
| style="text-align:left;"| A Just Russia — For Truth
| 1,064
| 0.15
|-
| style="background-color:;"|
| style="text-align:left;"| Khalid Nakaev
| style="text-align:left;"| Communist Party
| 835
| 0.12
|-
| style="text-align:left;" colspan="3"| Valid votes
| 713,872
| 99.97
|-
| style="text-align:left;" colspan="3"| Blank ballots
| 237
| 0.03
|- style="font-weight:bold"
| style="text-align:left;" colspan="3"| Total
| 714,109
| 100.00
|-
| style="background-color:#E9E9E9;" colspan="6"|
|-
| style="text-align:left;" colspan="3"| Turnout
| 714,109
| 94.61
|-
| style="text-align:left;" colspan="3"| Registered voters
| 754.790
| 100.00
|-
| colspan="5" style="background-color:#E9E9E9;"|
|- style="font-weight:bold"
| colspan="4" |Source:
|
|}

References

Chechnya
September 2021 events in Russia
Elections in Chechnya